HMS Berwick, pennant number 65, was a   heavy cruiser of the British Royal Navy, part of the Kent subclass. She was built by Fairfield Shipbuilding and Engineering Company (Govan, Scotland), with the keel being laid down on 15 September 1924. She was launched on 30 March 1926 and commissioned 12 July 1927.

History

When completed Berwick was sent to the China Station, where she remained until a temporary detachment to the Mediterranean in 1936. After this work, she completed her sea trials and then proceeded west where she served on the America and West Indies Station with the 8th Cruiser Squadron, based at the HM Dockyard Bermuda, until 1939. When the Second World War started, she served on ocean convoy escort duties, then formed part of Force "F" (with ) when hunting groups were formed to find German raiders. She did not make contact with any raider, but intercepted the mercantile blockade runners Wolfsburg and Uruguay in the Denmark Straits during March 1940.

On 9 April 1940 she participated in the Norwegian Campaign and on 10 May 1940 in the Invasion of Iceland. She was then allocated to Force "H" at Gibraltar arriving on 7 November. A second round that struck her some minutes later destroyed the after electric switchboard, leaving the cruiser's aft section without power. Some sources credit the second hit to a Trento-class Italian cruiser, either Trieste or Trento, the only Italian heavy cruisers within range at the time of the impact.

Despite being thoroughly ready for combat Berwick got the worst of the encounter. She scored no hits on Admiral Hipper, and sustained a fair amount of damage,  being hit by several 8-inch (which for the most part passed right through the ship) and 4.1-inch shells. The action did however, drive off Admiral Hipper, and saved the convoy from any losses. Four of her complement were killed and she had to return to Britain for repairs, which lasted until June 1941.

When repaired Berwick joined the Home Fleet and for the remainder of her wartime career she was escorting convoys to North Russia and operating in the northern North Sea, where she served under the captaincy of Norman Vere Grace from January to August 1944. In late October 1944 the ship carried Free Norwegian Forces from Britain to Murmansk, so that they could participate in the Liberation of Finnmark. Berwicks last role was to escort carriers that were raiding the Norwegian coast in 1945.

After the war she was allocated to BISCO for scrapping on 15 June 1948 and arrived at Hughes Bolckow, Blyth, on 12 July for breaking up.

Citations

References

External links

HMS Berwick at U-boat.net
Royal Navy Log Books of the World War 1 Era - HMS Berwick

Kent-class cruisers
County-class cruisers of the Royal Navy
Ships built in Govan
1926 ships
World War II cruisers of the United Kingdom